Odrowąż may refer to several places:

Odrowąż, Lesser Poland Voivodeship (south Poland)
Odrowąż, Opoczno County in Łódź Voivodeship (central Poland)
Odrowąż, Radomsko County in Łódź Voivodeship (central Poland)
Odrowąż, Świętokrzyskie Voivodeship (south-central Poland)
Odrowąż, Greater Poland Voivodeship (west-central Poland)
Odrowąż, Opole Voivodeship (south-west Poland)

See also 
 Odrowąż family
 Odrowąż coat of arms